Riker is a given name with different origins. It may be a transferred use of a surname of German origin. or a surname derived from a Dutch diminutive of Richard. Usage of the name might have increased due to association with the Star Trek: The Next Generation character William Riker.

Notes